Mamadi Camara (born February 25, 1995) is a Guinean professional footballer who plays as a forward.

Early life
Camara was born in Guinea, before moving to Montreal in Canada aged four-years old. He is a dual Guinean and Canadian national.

Camara played four seasons of college soccer at Division II Simon Fraser University in the Great Northwest Athletic Conference between 2015 and 2018, where he made 69 appearances, scoring 29 goals and tallying 20 assists. Over his four years for SFU, he was named to the GNAC first all-star team each year, the All-West team in his final three years, and GNAC player of the year in his senior season.

Club career
While at college, Camara played in the Première Ligue de soccer du Québec with CS Longueuil in 2014 and 2015. In 2016, during his summer break, he was invited to train with Whitecaps FC 2, the second team of Major League Soccer club Vancouver Whitecaps FC. In 2017, he joined USL PDL club Vancouver TSS FC Rovers and then in the following year, he joined Calgary Foothills. In 2019, he played with PLSQ club CS St-Hubert. Afterwards, he returned to B.C., and joined amateur side Surrey Central City Breakers FC, helping them win the 2019 Challenge Trophy as national champions.

Prior to the 2019 MLS SuperDraft, Camara was one of six Canadians, and the only NCAA Division II player, invited to the MLS Combine. On January 11, 2019, Camara was selected 46th overall in the 2019 MLS SuperDraft by San Jose Earthquakes. He became the first player who played in the PLSQ to be drafted into the MLS. However, he did not sign with the club.

On December 17, 2019, Camara joined USL Championship side Colorado Springs Switchbacks ahead of their 2020 season. He scored his first professional goal on September 16 against El Paso Locomotive.

In 2021, he returned to the semi-professional PLSQ with Celtix du Haut-Richelieu, where he scored 11 goals in 10 matches. He was leading the league in scoring with 11 goals in 10 matches, at the time he departed the club for a professional opportunity.

On September 1, 2021, he signed with HFX Wanderers FC of the Canadian Premier League for the remainder of the 2021 season. In his second appearance, on September 6 against York United FC, he was nearly credited with his first goal, after his header hit the crossbar then deflected off a defender into the goal, ultimately being ruled an own goal. He scored his first CPL goal on October 3 against York. He departed the club at the end of the season.

In February 2022, Camara signed with FC Edmonton.

Career statistics

References

External links
 Camara's profile on SwitchbacksFC.com
 

1995 births
Living people
Association football forwards
Guinean footballers
Canadian soccer players
Soccer players from Montreal
Guinean emigrants to Canada
Canadian expatriate soccer players
Guinean expatriate footballers
Expatriate soccer players in the United States
Canadian expatriate sportspeople in the United States
Guinean expatriate sportspeople in the United States
CS Longueuil players
Simon Fraser Clan men's soccer players
TSS FC Rovers players
Calgary Foothills FC players
CS St-Hubert players
San Jose Earthquakes draft picks
Colorado Springs Switchbacks FC players
Celtix du Haut-Richelieu players
HFX Wanderers FC players
FC Edmonton players
USL League Two players
USL Championship players
Première ligue de soccer du Québec players
Canadian Premier League players